Dual Mono is the third studio album by The Greenhornes, released on October 15, 2002. It consists of 12 songs, 11 of which were written by the Greenhornes, and one by Bob Wackett. It received a positive review from AllMusic, garnering 4.5 stars out of 5.

Track listing
All songs by The Greenhornes, except where noted.

 "Satisfy My Mind"
 "The Way It's Meant to Be"
 "Three Faint Calls"
 "It Returns"
 "Hard Times"
 "Too Much Sorrow"
 "You'll Be Sorry"
 "There Is An End"
 "It's Not Real"
 "Don't Come Running to Me"
 "Pigtails and Kneesocks"
 "Gonna Get Me Someone" (Bob Wackett)

Personnel
The Greenhornes
Craig Fox - vocals, guitar, piano, percussion
Eric Stein - vocals, guitar, harpsichord, percussion
Patrick Keeler - harmonica, Clavinet, drums, percussion
Jack Lawrence - harpsichord, bass, percussion, background vocals

Guest musicians
 Holly Golightly - vocals on "Gonna Get Me Someone" and "There is an End".

References

2002 albums
The Greenhornes albums
Telstar Records albums